Pristidactylus alvaroi is a species of lizard in the family Leiosauridae. The species is endemic to the Chilean Matorral ecoregion within Chile.

Etymology
The specific name, alvaroi, is in honor of Álvaro Donoso-Barros, the son of herpetologist Roberto Donoso-Barros, who first described the species in 1975.

Habitat

Reproduction
P. alvaroi is oviparous.

References

Sources
Hogan, C. Michael, & World Wildlife Fund (2013). Chilean Matorral. Ed. Mark McGinley. Encyclopedia of Earth. National Council for Science and the Environment. Washington DC

Further reading
Donoso-Barros R (1975). "Neuvos reptiles y anfibios de Chile ". Boletin de la Sociedad de Biologia de Concepción 48: 217–229. (Cupriguanus alvaroi, new species, pp. 221–224, Figures 3–5). (in Spanish, with an abstract in English).
Etheridge R, Williams EE (1985). "Notes on Pristidactylus (Squamata: Iguanidae)". Breviora (483): 1–18. (Pristidactylus alvaroi, new combination, p. 13).
Lehr E (2002). Amphibien und Reptilien in Peru. Münster: Natur und Tier Verlag. 208 pp. . (Pristidactylus alvaroi, p. 203). (in German).

Pristidactylus
Reptiles of Chile
Reptiles described in 1975
Taxa named by Roberto Donoso-Barros
Taxonomy articles created by Polbot
Endemic fauna of Chile